This is a list of episodes for the children's television programme ZZZap! Aimed for hearing-impaired children, the show produced ten series that aired on ITV between 8 January 1993 and 21 September 2001.

Series overview

Episodes

Series 1 (1993)
Series 1 introduced all the main characters – Cuthbert Lilly, Smart Arty, The Handymen and Tricky Dicky.

Series 2 (1994) 
Series 2 saw the departure of Tricky Dicky and the inclusion of a new character – Daisy Dares, played by Deborah McCallum. The episodes were produced in 1993.

Series 3 (1995)

Series 4 (1996)

Cuthbert's Diary (1996)

Christmas Annuals (1996)

Series 5 (1997)

Summer Specials (1997)

Autumn Specials (1997)

Christmas Annual (1997)

Series 6 (1998)

Series 7 (1998)

Series 8 (1999)
Series 8 saw the departure of Smart Arty and the inclusion of a new character – Minnie The Mini Magician, played by Sophie Aldred.

Series 9 (2000)
Series 9 saw the departure of Deborah McCallum as Daisy Dares, and the arrival of Claire Macaulay taking up the role.

Series 10 (2001)
The final series of ZZZap! Series 10 saw the departure of the giant comic for transitions, which were replaced by CGI graphics.

External links
 

Lists of British children's television series episodes
Zzzap episodes list of